The Solicitor-General of Australian Capital Territory, known informally as the Solicitor-General, is the territory's Second Law Officer, and the deputy of the Attorney-General. The Solicitor-General can exercise the powers of the Attorney-General in their absence. The Solicitor-General acts alongside the Crown Advocate and Crown Solicitor, and serves as one of the legal and constitutional advisers of the Crown and its government in the Australian Capital Territory.

The Solicitor-General is addressed in court as "Mr/Ms Solicitor". Despite the title, the position is currently occupied by a barrister, though any Australian legal practitioner of at least five years experience is eligible for appointment for a term of no more than seven years. The inaugural and current Solicitor-General is Peter Garrison .

History and function 
The Law Officers Act 2011 (ACT) (the Act) provides for the office of Solicitor-General. The Act provides for an appointment for a term not exceeding seven years, with the possibility of renewal.

Office-holders (2011-present)

References 

Australian Capital Territory law